Moghanlu may refer to:
 Moghanlu, Ardabil
 Moghanlu, Kurdistan
 Moghanlu, Mahneshan, Zanjan Province
 Moghanlu, Anguran, Mahneshan County, Zanjan Province